Jonathan K. Paulien (born  1949) is a Seventh-day Adventist theologian.

Biography
Paulien has a BA from Atlantic Union College, and an M.Div. and Ph.D. from Andrews University. Prior to his Ph.D., he worked as a Seventh-day Adventist church pastor for several years in New York City.

He was professor of New Testament Interpretation at the Seventh-day Adventist Theological Seminary at Andrews University. He spent over two decades at Andrews. In 2007, he became dean of the Faculty of Religion at Loma Linda University, a position he held until 2019.

He and his wife Pamella have three children.

Theology 

Paulien stated he has found material on the "stages of faith" to be "the most life-changing material I have ever learned or shared."

Publications
Paulien writes primarily for a Seventh-day Adventist audience.  The majority of his books and articles have been published by non-academic publishing houses and magazines owned by the Seventh-day Adventist church.  His scholarly articles also have been largely published by Seventh-day Adventist journals.

Non-Academic Books

 2008. Armageddon at the Door: An Insider's Guide to the Book of Revelation
 2008. Everlasting Gospel, Ever-Changing World
 2004. The Deep Things of God: An Insider's Guide to the Book of Revelation
 2003. John: The Beloved Gospel
 2002. The Day That Changed the World: Seeking God After September 11
 2001. Everyday Faith: How to Have an Authentic Relationship With God in the Real World
 1999. The Millennium Bug: Is This the End of the World As We Know It
 1995. John: Jesus Gives Life to a New Generation (The Abundant life Bible amplifier) with George R. Knight
 1994. End Time (full title (As speculation builds, let's keep our eyes focused on) What the Bible says about the end-time)
 1993. Present Truth in the Real World: The Adventist Struggle to Keep and Share Faith in a Secular Society

Articles
 "The End of Historicism? Reflections on the Adventist Approach to Biblical Apocalyptic" -  Journal of the Adventist Theological Society 14:2 (Fall 2003), p15–43;  JATS 17:1 (Spring 2006), p180–208
 "". Journal of the Adventist Theological Society 9:1–2 (1998), p179–186
 "Armageddon" entry in Anchor Bible Dictionary I:394-5

See also 

 Seventh-day Adventist Church
 Seventh-day Adventist theology
 Seventh-day Adventist eschatology
 History of the Seventh-day Adventist Church
 28 Fundamental Beliefs
 Questions on Doctrine
 Teachings of Ellen G. White
 Inspiration of Ellen G. White
 Prophecy in the Seventh-day Adventist Church
 Investigative judgment
 Pillars of Adventism
 Second Coming
 Conditional Immortality
 Historicism
 Three Angels' Messages
 Sabbath in seventh-day churches
 Ellen G. White
 Adventism
 Seventh-day Adventist Church Pioneers
 Seventh-day Adventist worship
 Ellen G. White Estate
 Loma Linda University

External links
 Revelation-Armageddon.com, Paulien's blog, which has as its purpose "to provide sane, evidence-based information about the Bible’s Book of Revelation" in today's context
 The Battle of Armageddon.com, companion website, also by Paulien
 "Simply Revelation" 3ABN interview (part 1, part 2)
 Book of Revelation, a personal translation by Paulien
 Articles by Paulien cataloged in the Seventh-day Adventist Periodical Index (SDAPI)
 Andrews University faculty entry
 Loma Linda University faculty entry

References

Seventh-day Adventist religious workers
Seventh-day Adventist theologians
20th-century Protestant theologians
1949 births
Living people
American Christian theologians
American Seventh-day Adventists